Podohydnangium is a fungal genus in the family Hydnangiaceae. A monotypic genus, it contains the single gasteroid species Podohydnangium australe, found in Australia.

References

External links

Monotypic Agaricales genera
Hydnangiaceae